Steven Zellner (born 14 March 1991) is a German professional footballer who plays as a midfielder for 1. FC Saarbrücken.

Club career
Zellner was born in Wadern. He made his Bundesliga debut on 11 February 2012 in a 2–0 loss away to FC Bayern Munich.

On 2 February 2015, it was announced that Zellner had moved to fellow 2. Bundesliga club SV Sandhausen. He signed a contract for the remainder of the 2014–15 season including an extension clause.

References

External links
 
 

1991 births
Living people
People from Merzig-Wadern
German footballers
Footballers from Saarland
Association football forwards
Germany youth international footballers
Bundesliga players
2. Bundesliga players
Regionalliga players
1. FC Kaiserslautern players
1. FC Kaiserslautern II players
SV Sandhausen players
1. FC Saarbrücken players